Guilty Hands is a 1931 American pre-Code crime film starring Lionel Barrymore, Kay Francis and Madge Evans and directed by W. S. Van Dyke, with uncredited assistance from Barrymore.  The story concerns an attorney who murders a man who wants to marry his daughter.

Plot
On a train trip, lawyer Richard Grant (Lionel Barrymore) tells fellow passengers that, based on his long experience both prosecuting and defending murder cases, murder is sometimes justified and a clever man should be able to commit it undetected. He is traveling to the isolated estate of his wealthy client and friend, Gordon Rich (Alan Mowbray); his young adult daughter Barbara (Madge Evans) surprises him at the train station, where she informs him that she has already been there a week.

Grant's view is soon put to the test. Rich asks him to rewrite his will, including bequests to all his former mistresses (except one who is dead already; she was just 16, and Grant believes it was suicide). When Rich explains that he wants a new will because he intends to marry Barbara, Grant is appalled. He repeats what he said on the train. Rich deserves to be murdered, and if that is what it takes to stop the marriage, Grant will do it and get away with it. Rich retorts that if necessary he will retaliate from beyond the grave.

Grant pleads with his daughter, pointing out the great age difference and Rich's indecent character. But she loves Rich and is adamant. Nor has Tommy Osgood (William Bakewell), a young man Barbara had been seeing, been able to change her mind.

At a dinner party that night, Rich announces the wedding and says it will take place in the morning. His longtime girlfriend, Marjorie West (Kay Francis), is dismayed, but after the party he assures her that, as usual, he will return to her once he exhausts his obsession with Barbara. He is only marrying Barbara because she would not go to bed with him otherwise.

Rich orders two servants to watch Grant's bungalow on the estate, but Grant uses a cutout mounted on a record player to cast a moving shadow on the curtain to make it appear that he is pacing restlessly, and slips back to the main house. Meanwhile, Rich goes to Barbara's room. He loses control and grabs her roughly; she recoils in disgust and he leaves.

Rich then writes a letter to the police accusing Grant in case he is found dead. At this point, Grant sneaks into the room, takes Rich's gun from his desk, and shoots him during a clap of thunder. Grant places the gun in the dead man's hand, takes the letter, and returns to his room just in time to be seen by the servants. When the body is discovered, Grant insists that his host must have committed suicide. To Grant's shock, Barbara soon informs him that she had changed her mind, rendering the crime unnecessary.

Alone of all the houseguests, Marjorie West is certain it was murder. She figures out how Grant concocted his alibi, then accidentally finds the imprint of the incriminating letter on the desk blotter. However, Grant returns and wrestles the evidence away from her. He tells her that if she accuses him, he will trump up a murder case against her, based on her jealousy of Barbara and her inheritance under Rich's existing will; but if not, she is free to enjoy Rich's fortune.

When the police arrive, West is uncertain what to do. The coroner examines (and moves) the body. The chief of police, an old friend, accepts Grant's "conclusion" that it was suicide. West finally decides to speak out, but just then a gradual rigor mortis contraction of the victim's trigger finger fires the gun, fatally wounding Grant. "You did it, Rich", he remarks. He then asks Tommy to take good care of Barbara. Seeing no reason to hurt Barbara, Marjorie decides to remain silent.

Cast
 Lionel Barrymore as Richard Grant
 Kay Francis as Marjorie West
 Madge Evans as Barbara "Babs" Grant
 William Bakewell as Tommy Osgood
 C. Aubrey Smith as Reverend Hastings
 Polly Moran as Aunt Maggie
 Alan Mowbray as Gordon Rich
 Forrester Harvey as Spencer Wilson
 Charles Crockett as H. G. Smith
 Henry Barrows as Harvey Scott
 Sam McDaniel as Jimmy (uncredited)
 Blue Washington as Johnny (uncredited)

References

External links
 
 
 
 

1931 films
1931 crime drama films
American crime drama films
American black-and-white films
Films set on trains
Metro-Goldwyn-Mayer films
Films directed by Lionel Barrymore
Films directed by W. S. Van Dyke
1930s American films
1930s English-language films